Birger Madsen (born 23 April 1982) is a Norwegian former professional football defender.

He played in Tippeligaen for Sandefjord, Vålerenga and Start, before retiring after the 2013 season due to illness.

Career statistics

References

1982 births
Living people
Footballers from Oslo
Norwegian footballers
Skeid Fotball players
Sandefjord Fotball players
Vålerenga Fotball players
IK Start players
Eliteserien players

Association football defenders